Cryptantha is a genus of flowering plants in the borage family, Boraginaceae. They are known commonly as cat's eyes and popcorn flowers (the latter name is also used to refer to the closely related genus Plagiobothrys, and members of the subtribe of Amsinckiinae). They are distributed throughout western North America and western South America, but they are absent from the regions in between.

These are annual or perennial herbs usually coated in rough hairs and bearing rounded flower corollas that are almost always white, but are yellow in a few species. Several morphological characters are used to distinguish species from one another, but the most definitive is the form of the nutlet, which varies in shape, size, color, and pattern of attachment.

Systematics
The genus has been reorganized several times. As of 2012 there are about 200 species. About 130 are limited to western North America, and about 70 species occur in western South America; three species are found on both continents.

Species include:
Cryptantha affinis – slender catseye, common cryptantha, quill cryptantha
Cryptantha alfalfalis
Cryptantha alyssoides
Cryptantha ambigua – basin cryptantha, obscure cryptantha, Wilke's cryptantha
Cryptantha aprica
Cryptantha argentea
Cryptantha barbigera — bearded catseye
 
Cryptantha calycina
Cryptantha calycotricha
Cryptantha capituliflora
Cryptantha carrizalensis
Cryptantha chaetocalyx
Cryptantha clandestina
Cryptantha clevelandii – Cleveland's cryptantha
Cryptantha clokeyi – Clokey's cryptantha
Cryptantha congesta
Cryptantha crassisepala – deertongue, thick-sepal catseye
Cryptantha crinita – Sacramento cryptantha
Cryptantha cynoglossoides

Cryptantha decipiens – gravel cryptantha, gravel-bar catseye
Cryptantha dichita
Cryptantha diffusa
Cryptantha dimorpha
Cryptantha dissita
Cryptantha dolichophylla
Cryptantha dumetorum – bush-loving catseye
Cryptantha echinella – hedgehog cryptantha, prickly cryptantha
Cryptantha excavata – deepscar cryptantha

Cryptantha fendleri – Fendler's cryptantha, sand-dune catseye
Cryptantha filaginea
Cryptantha filiformis
Cryptantha flaccida – weakstem cryptantha
Cryptantha foliosa

Cryptantha ganderi – Gander's cryptantha
Cryptantha glareosa
Cryptantha globulifera
Cryptantha glomeriflora – Truckee cryptantha
Cryptantha glomerulifera
Cryptantha gnaphalioides
Cryptantha gracilis – narrowstem catseye, narrowstem pick-me-not
Cryptantha granulosa
Cryptantha haplostachya
Cryptantha hispidula – Napa cryptantha
Cryptantha hooveri – Hoover's cryptantha
Cryptantha incana – Tulare cryptantha
Cryptantha intermedia – Clearwater catseye, common cryptantha
Cryptantha involucrata

Cryptantha kelseyana – Kelsey's cryptantha
Cryptantha kingii
Cryptantha latefissa
Cryptantha leiocarpa – coastal cryptantha
Cryptantha limensis
Cryptantha linearis
Cryptantha longifolia
Cryptantha macrocalyx
Cryptantha marioricardiana
Cryptantha mariposae – Mariposa cryptantha
Cryptantha maritima – Guadalupe catseye
Cryptantha marticorenae
Cryptantha martirensis
Cryptantha mendocina
Cryptantha microstachys – Tejon cryptantha
Cryptantha milobakeri – Milo Baker's cryptantha
Cryptantha minima – little catseye, small cryptantha
Cryptantha mohavensis – Mojave cryptantha
Cryptantha muricata – pointed catseye, prickly cryptantha
Cryptantha nemaclada : Colusa cryptantha
Cryptantha nevadensis : Nevada catseye
Cryptantha oxygona – sharpnut cryptantha, sharpseed cryptantha
Cryptantha papillosa
Cryptantha patagonica
Cryptantha patula
Cryptantha peruviana
Cryptantha phaceloides
Cryptantha pterocarya – winged pick-me-not, wingnut catseye
Cryptantha recurvata – curvenut catseye
Cryptantha romanii
Cryptantha rostellata – beaked catseye
Cryptantha scoparia – desert cryptantha, pinyon desert cryptantha
Cryptantha simulans – pine cryptantha, pinewoods cryptantha
Cryptantha spathulata
Cryptantha subamplexicaulis
Cryptantha taltalensis
Cryptantha texana
Cryptantha torreyana – Torrey's catseye
Cryptantha traskiae – Trask's cryptantha
Cryptantha utahensis – scented catseye, Utah cryptantha
Cryptantha vidali
Cryptantha virens
Cryptantha volckmannii
Cryptantha watsonii – Watson's cryptantha
Cryptantha werdermanniana
Cryptantha wigginsii

Formerly placed here

Many Cryptantha have been transferred to other genera:

Greeneocharis circumscissa (as Cryptantha circumscissa)
Johnstonella angustifolia (as Cryptantha angustifolia)
Johnstonella micromeres (as Cryptantha micromeres)
Oreocarya confertiflora (as Cryptantha confertiflora)
Oreocarya crassipes (as Cryptantha crassipes) 
Oreocarya flavoculata (as Cryptantha flavoculata)
Oreocarya roosiorum (as Cryptantha roosiorum)
Oreocarya subcapitata (as Cryptantha subcapitata)
Oreocarya suffruticosa var. suffruticosa (as Cryptantha cinerea)
Oreocarya virginensis (as Cryptantha virginensis)

References

External links
 

 
Flora of North America
Flora of South America
Boraginaceae genera